Zygmunt Siedlecki (4 April 1907 – 28 August 1977) was a Polish athlete. He competed in the men's decathlon at the 1932 Summer Olympics.

References

1907 births
1977 deaths
People from Pinsk District
People from Pinsky Uyezd
Polish decathletes
Olympic athletes of Poland
Athletes (track and field) at the 1932 Summer Olympics
Polish athletics coaches